Alicia Bozon (born 1 June 1984) is a French former freestyle swimmer who competed in the 2000 Summer Olympics.

References

1984 births
Living people
People from Chambray-lès-Tours
Sportspeople from Indre-et-Loire
French female freestyle swimmers
Olympic swimmers of France
Swimmers at the 2000 Summer Olympics
European Aquatics Championships medalists in swimming
Mediterranean Games silver medalists for France
Mediterranean Games medalists in swimming
Swimmers at the 2001 Mediterranean Games
20th-century French women
21st-century French women